Zazi Maidan District, or Jaji Maidan or Dzadzi Maidan, is located in the northeastern part of Khost Province, Afghanistan. It borders Bak District to the west, Paktia Province to the north, and the Kurram Agency of Pakistan to the north and east. According to Afghanistan's National Statistics and Information Authority (NSIA), the 2020 estimated population of the district was 26,236 people. The district center is the village of Zazi Maidan, situated in the eastern part of the district.

See also
Districts of Afghanistan

References

External links
2 water check dams worth 23m afs put into service in Khost (Pajhwok Afghan News, March 24, 2021)

Districts of Khost Province